Channel 24 is a Bangladeshi Bengali-language satellite and cable television channel airing programming relating to news and current affairs, owned by Times Media Limited, a subsidiary of the Ha-meem Group. The channel was launched on 24 May 2012 initially as a mixed entertainment channel, before moving to solely airing news programming.

History 
Channel 24 was granted a license to broadcast in February 2010 by the Bangladesh Telecommunication Regulatory Commission. It began test transmissions on 22 August 2011. Although initially planning to do so in December of that year, it officially commenced transmissions on 24 May 2012.

Originally, its programming line was diversified, consisting of drama, news, television films, music, sports, talk shows, and many more. It also offered programming targeted towards viewers in Chittagong, which are broadcast from the city. It has later changed its focus to mostly airing news and current affairs programming. Within two years of its launch, Channel 24 became the top news channel in Bangladesh. Channel 24 was one of the nine Bangladeshi television channels to sign an agreement with Bdnews24.com to subscribe to a video-based news agency run by children called Prism in May 2016.

Programming
 Amar Joto Gaan
 Beyond the Gallery: The daily sports program broadcast by the network. It focuses on local and international sports events, with special emphasis on cricket and football, daily events, special reports, analyses and investigative reports.
 Entertainment 24
 Lifestyle 24
 Mukhomukhi
 Prosongo Rajniti
 Sports 24

References

Television channels and stations established in 2012
Television channels in Bangladesh
Mass media in Dhaka
24-hour television news channels in Bangladesh
2012 establishments in Bangladesh